South African Canadians are Canadians of South African descent. Most South African Canadians are White South Africans, mostly of British and Afrikaner ancestry. According to the Canada 2016 Census there were 44,660 South African born immigrants in Canada. It includes those who hold or have ever held permanent resident status in Canada, including naturalized citizens. Also, the census revealed 1,870  people of Afrikaner descent in Canada, although most Afrikaners in Canada may declare different countries of origin from Southern Africa.

Demographics 
South African born immigrants in Canada by province and territory as recorded in the Canada 2016 Census:

Notable South African Canadians 

Arlene Dickinson, businesswoman
Jay Manuel, director creative and make-up artist
Kim Brunhuber, journalist
Neill Blomkamp, film director, film producer, screenwriter, and animator
Kevin Harmse, soccer player
Luca Bellisomo, soccer player
Lisa de Nikolits, writer
Tony Dean Smith, film and television director, screenwriter, and editor
Derek Muller, science communicator, film-maker and television personality, also known by YouTube channel Veritasium
Elon Musk, business magnate, investor, engineer and inventor. Founder of SpaceX, co-founder of PayPal and Tesla, Inc.
Robin Esrock, travel writer
Mpho Koaho, actor
Steve Nash, basketball player
Johannes Sauer, sport shooter
Mike Botha, master diamond cutter
D. T. H. van der Merwe, rugby union player
Murad Velshi, former politician in Ontario

See also 

 South African diaspora
 Dutch Canadians
Canadian Immigrant population by country of birth

References